Petr Starec (born 5 December 1951) is a Czech figure skating coach and former competitor. As a single skater, he became a two-time Czechoslovak national bronze medalist and competed at the 1969 European Championships in Garmisch-Partenkirchen, finishing 18th.

Starec later teamed up with Rijana Hartmanová to compete in pair skating. They won the 1974 national title and placed 13th at the 1974 European Championships in Zagreb.

Starec is the head of the Department of Sports at Masaryk University in Brno. He has coached Michal Březina (from 2004 to 2012), Eliška Březinová (until 2012), Alexandra Kunová, and Petr Kotlařík.

Competitive highlights

Men's singles

Pairs with Hartmanová

References 

1951 births
Czech figure skating coaches
Czech male pair skaters
Czech male single skaters
Czechoslovak male pair skaters
Czechoslovak male single skaters
Living people
Figure skaters from Brno
Academic staff of Masaryk University